is a male Japanese voice actor from Kanagawa Prefecture. He revealed himself as Satomi Arai's husband, having married since 2008 and had a son in 2010, though Yoshimitsu revealed his marital status in 2016.

Filmography

Film animation
Yo-kai Watch Shadowside the Movie: Resurrection of the Demon King (2017) as Onimaru Leader

Television animation
Rockman EXE (2002-2003) as GutsMan
Naruto (2002-2009) as Inabi Uchiha, Tobio's Father
Hamtaro (2003) as Dukusuke the owl
Rockman EXE Axess (2003-2004) as GutsMan and GravityMan
Rockman EXE Stream (2004-2005) as GutsMan and GravityMan
Rockman EXE Beast (2005-2006) as GutsMan
Rockman EXE Beast+ (2006) as GutsMan
Gintama (2006-2018) as shop owner, Muu-san, Arsonist, others.
Tokyo Majin (2007) as Tsutsumidoori
Black Butler (2009) as Harold West (eps 14–15)
Fairy Tail (2009-2019) as Alzack Connell, Cancer, Earthland Sugarboy, Obra, Sugarboy, Semmes, Bora, Warcry, Kurohebi, Motherglare
Bakuman (2011-2013) as Naoto Ogawa
Mobile Suit Gundam-san (2014) as Kai-san
Legend of the Galactic Heroes (2018) as the narrator
Dragon Pilot: Hisone and Masotan (2018) as Iboshi
Star Twinkle PreCure (2019) as Notrei and Notrigger
Vinland Saga (2019) as Halfdan
True Cooking Master Boy (2019-2021) as Zhou Yu
In/Spectre (2020) as Kappa, Ochimusha, Ushi no Ayakashi
Ranking of Kings (2021) as Desha
Shenmue (2022) as Chai

Original video animation (OVA)
Utawarerumono (2009) as Mukkuru

Original net animation (ONA)
Star Wars: Visions - The Village Bride (2021) as Izuma

Tokusatsu
'"Tokusou Sentai Dekaranger (2004) as Beesian Beeling (ep. 26)Juken Sentai Gekiranger (2007) as Five Venom Fist Confrontation Beast Centipede-Fist Kademu (ep. 4 - 5)Kamen Rider Kiva (2008) as Tortoise Fangire (ep. 32 - 33)Samurai Sentai Shinkenger (2009) as Ayakashi Hachouchin (ep. 14)Kamen Rider × Kamen Rider OOO & W Featuring Skull: Movie War Core (2010) as Pteranodon Yummy (Male)Kaizoku Sentai Gokaiger (2011) as SugorminShin Godzilla (2016)

Video gamesMega Man Network Transmission (2003) as GutsMan and GravityManFairy Tail: Gekitou! Madoushi Kessen (2010) as LullabyBlack Rock Shooter: The Game (2011) as KaliFighting EX Layer (2018) as Cracker JackFairy Tail (2020) as MotherglareFairy Tail: Guild Masters (2021) as Bora

Japanese dub
Live-actionPower Rangers Turbo as Blue SenturionPower Rangers in Space as Blue Senturion, Gold RangerRed Dawn as Robert Kitner (Josh Hutcherson)Roboshark as Bill GlatesTekken as Marshall Law
AnimationRango as JedidiahUncle Grandpa'' as Belly Bag

References

External links
Official website 

1976 births
Living people
Japanese male video game actors
Japanese male voice actors
Male voice actors from Kanagawa Prefecture
20th-century Japanese male actors
21st-century Japanese male actors